Cushman Kellogg Davis (June 16, 1838November 27, 1900) was an American Republican politician who served as the seventh Governor of Minnesota and as a U.S. Senator from Minnesota.

Early life and American Civil War
Davis was born in Henderson, New York to Horatio N. Davis and Clarissa Cushman. His family moved to Wisconsin Territory before he was a year old (his father went on to serve as a member of the Wisconsin State Senate several different times). Cushman went to school at Carroll College and then the University of Michigan, graduating in 1857. Admitted to the bar in 1860, he soon after found himself serving in the American Civil War in the 28th Wisconsin Volunteer Infantry Regiment, serving first as a lieutenant in charge of Company B of this volunteer regiment. He was in action in the western campaigns, then in 1864 as an aide to General Willis A. Gorman.

Political career
Davis returned home in 1864 due to poor health. He relocated to St. Paul, Minnesota due to its reputation as a health resort and began to pursue a legal and political career. He was elected to the Minnesota State House of Representatives from 1867 to 1868 and was appointed as the United States District Attorney from 1868 to 1873. He resigned his position to run as the Republican candidate for Minnesota governor and won. During his term, he established a state board of railway commissioners, revised the state constitution to allow women to vote on school matters and hold elected office, and also provided assistance to farmers affected by a locust plague. He served one term from 1874 to 1876 and declined to be re-nominated for a second.

Return to legal career and second political career
Returning to his legal career, Davis successfully defended Judge Sherman Page in his 1878 impeachment trial. He also formed a partnership with Frank B. Kellogg and Cordenio Severance. In 1887, he was elected to the United States Senate. He would serve in the 50th, 51st, 52nd, 53rd, 54th, 55th, and 56th United States Congresses, from 1887 to 1900. He was involved with legislation related to pensions and the construction of the Soo Locks. Beginning in 1897 he was the chair of the Senate Foreign Relations Committee and was closely involved with the sequence of events leading to the Spanish–American War. He was also present at the talks for the Treaty of Paris which ended the war.

Personal life
Davis married Laura Bowman in 1862. He remarried Anna Malcom Agnew Fox at some point in the 1880s.

Honors
Davis was elected a member of the American Antiquarian Society in 1894.  He was elected a vice-president general of the National Society of the Sons of the American Revolution in 1895.

Death
Davis died while still in office in St. Paul on November 27, 1900. He is buried at Arlington National Cemetery in Virginia.

See also
List of United States Congress members who died in office (1900–49)

References

Attribution:

Further reading

External links

Memorial addresses on the life and character of Cushman Kellogg Davis, late a representative from Minnesota delivered in the House of Representatives and Senate frontispiece 1901

  	

1838 births
1900 deaths
People from Henderson, New York
Republican Party governors of Minnesota
Republican Party members of the Minnesota House of Representatives
People of Wisconsin in the American Civil War
University of Michigan alumni
19th-century American Episcopalians
Carroll University alumni
Republican Party United States senators from Minnesota
19th-century American politicians
Members of the American Antiquarian Society
Chairmen of the Senate Committee on Foreign Relations